Ssamzie Sound Festival was an annual indie music festival held in South Korea since 1999.
The first version of the festival was held in Yonsei University, with 20 local bands performing.
The festival started out as a free one-day-festival, but as the festival got more attention it grew.
The "Sumun Gosu" was a gateway to success in a career for Korean indie band.

1999 line-up 
23 October, Yonsei University

2000 line-up 
7 October, Yonsei University

2001 line-up 
6 October, Yonsei University

2002 line-up 
5 October, Sungkyunkwan University

2003 line-up 
3 October, Ewha University

2004 line-up 
2 October, Sungkyunkwan University

2005 line-up 
2 October, Hanyang University

2006 line-up 
30 September, Olympic Park

2007 line-up 
30 September, Hangang Nanji Park

See also
 
List of music festivals in South Korea
List of indie rock festivals

References

External links
 ssamziesoundfestival.com

Music festivals established in 1999
Music festivals in South Korea
Electronic music festivals in South Korea
Rock festivals in South Korea
Indie rock festivals
Annual events in South Korea
Free festivals
Autumn events in South Korea